{{speciesbox
| taxon = Lentzea jiangxiensis
| authority = Li et al. 2012<ref name="Li">{{cite journal|last1=Li|first1=X.|last2=Zhang|first2=L.|last3=Ding|first3=Y.|last4=Gao|first4=Y.|last5=Ruan|first5=J.|last6=Huang|first6=Y.|title='Lentzea jiangxiensis sp. nov., isolated from acidic soil|journal=International Journal of Systematic and Evolutionary Microbiology|date=18 November 2011|volume=62|issue=Pt 10|pages=2342–2346|doi=10.1099/ijs.0.033795-0|pmid=22140164|doi-access=free}}</ref>
| type_strain = CGMCC 4.6609FXJ1.034NBRC 106680
| type_strain_ref = 
}}Lentzea jiangxiensis is a bacterium from the genus Lentzea'' which has been isolated from acidic soil in Jiangxi, China.

References

Pseudonocardiales
Bacteria described in 2012